Neidlingen is a municipality in the district of Esslingen, in Baden-Württemberg, Germany.

History
In 1807, Neidlingen, formerly a possession of the Kingdom of Bavaria, was assigned to the district of Wiesensteig in the Kingdom of Württemberg.

Nazi Germany and World War II
The Nazi Party was a political non-entity in Neidlingen until the federal elections of 1930, but only secured local plurality in the 1932 state election. A local Nazi Party affiliate was formed that year under Wilhelm Aysslinger, the party district manager. In the March 1933 German federal election, the Nazis received 80.6% of the vote in Nedilingen, and that May three Nazis were elected to the six-member municipal council. Oberamt Kirchheim was dissolved in 1938 and Neidlingen was assigned to Landkreis Nürtingen.

29 forced laborers from Poland, Russia, and Ukraine arrived at Neidlingen in 1941 to work on local farms. The US Army occupied the town on 21 April 1945 after a short fight with units of the German Army and German-aligned Russian Liberation Army.

After World War II
Neidlingen experienced a period of industrial growth in the 1950s. In 1973, following  of Baden-Württemberg, the town was assigned to the district of Esslingen.

Geography
Inside Esslingen's district, Neidlingen shares a border with Weilheim an der Teck, Bissingen an der Teck and Lenningen. Another 45% is used for agriculture, primarily for orchards. Its boundaries generally decided by the lay of the albtrauf, which sits atop the Brown and White Jurassic formations.

The Lindach and its valley begins to the southwest of the town in a plateau of the Jura that averages an elevation above sea level of  Normalnull (NN). The highest elevation in the municipality,  NN, is found here in the Drittelwald. The Lindach valley continues through Neidlingen to the northwest, widening until being narrowed by the Erkenberg and the Burz. Beyond this, the Lindach continues and marks the lowest elevation above sea level in the municipal area,  NN.

Politics
Neidlingen has one borough (Ortsteil), Neidlingen. There are five abandoned villages in its municipal area: Heimenstein, Lichtenstein, Merkenberg, Reußenstein, and Windeck.

Klaus Däschler has been mayor of Neidlingen since 2014. In 2021 Jürgen Ebler was elected mayor.

Coat of arms
Neidlingen's municipal coat of arms has its field divided party per fess into an upper, white section containing a green oak branch and a lower, green section with a large, white "N". This pattern dates to 1669, though the "N" first appeared in an earlier coat of arms from 1616. The oak branch was, from 1930 to 1953, replaced with a tree flanked by two saplings. The tincture was decided in 1953, and on 15 June 1953, the coat of arms was approved for official use by the provisional Württemberg-Baden government. The Federal Ministry of the Interior reapproved the coat of arms on 16 August 1973.

Transportation
The L1200 runs through the center of Neidlingen.

Citations

References

External links
  (in German)

Esslingen (district)